The 2008 Porsche Carrera Cup Deutschland season was the 23rd German Porsche Carrera Cup season. It began on 13 April at Hockenheim and finished on 26 October at the same circuit, after nine races. It ran as a support championship for the 2008 DTM season. René Rast won the first of his two championships with the MRS-Team.

Teams and drivers

Race calendar and results

Championship standings

Drivers' championship

† — Drivers did not finish the race, but were classified as they completed over 90% of the race distance.

External links
The Porsche Carrera Cup Germany website
Porsche Carrera Cup Germany Online Magazine

Porsche Carrera Cup Germany seasons
Porsche Carrera Cup Germany